The Italian Athletics Indoor Championships are the national championships in athletics of the indoor events, organised every year by the Federazione Italiana di Atletica Leggera from 1970 (first edition was held in Genoa). Titles assigned concern specialties indoors, so for example does not include 3000 meters steeplechase, discus throw, javelin throw, hammer throw.

Men

60 m, 200 m, 400 m

800 m, 1500 m, 3000 m

60 m hs, high jump, pole vault

Long jump, triple jump, shot put

Heptathlon, 5000 m walk, relays

Women

60 m, 200 m, 400 m

800 m, 1500 m, 3000 m

60 m hs, high jump, pole vault

Long jump, triple jump, shot put

Pentathlon, 3000 m walk

See also
 Italian Athletics Indoor Championships
 List of Italian Athletics Championships winners

References

External links
 

Winners
 List
Italian Indoor Championships
Athletics